Northam is a market town, civil parish and electoral ward in Devon, England, lying north of Bideford. The civil parish also includes the villages of Westward Ho!, Appledore, West Appledore, Diddywell, Buckleigh and Silford, and the residential areas of Orchard Hill and Raleigh Estate. The population at the 2011 census was 5,427.

History
Northam is thought to have been the site of an Anglo-Saxon earthwork fortification, and an area between Northam and Appledore is conjectured to have been where the Danish Viking Ubba (or Hubba) was repelled during the reign of Alfred the Great. This is commemorated in local place names like Bloody Corner and Hubba's Rock (or Hubbleston), which is supposed to be the site where Ubba was killed. It was also the site of the Battle of Northam in 1069 where the sons of Harold Godwinson were defeated. St Margaret's church is the Anglican parish church for the town and has been a Grade I listed building since 1951.

In 1832 a meeting was held in Northam to protest an attempt by Augustus Saltren-Willett, lord of the manor, to take ownership of the commons of Northam Burrows.

Royal North Devon Golf Club was formed at Northam Burrows in 1864; its course is the oldest on its original site in England.

Between 1901 and 1917, the town and golf course were served by Northam railway station.

Northam Burrows
A Site of Special Scientific Interest (SSSI), Northam Burrows is a saltmarsh and dune landscape, adjacent to the Torridge Estuary.

It is part of the North Devon Areas of Outstanding Natural Beauty, and sits within North Devon's Biosphere Reserve.

It is also home to the oldest golf course in England, the Royal North Devon Golf Club.

Sport and recreation
Northam has a King George's Field as a memorial to King George V.

Torridge Pool, off Churchill Way, has lane and learner pools but despite the name, it has a wider role as a leisure centre with gym and sauna.

Facilities
Northam has a public library.  This burned down in 2005 destroying the building and 90% of the books, in a fire believed to have been caused by the action of a hands-free magnifier on a pile of leaflets.  The public library was threatened with closure in 2014 due to cuts in the County's budget.

Railway
The Bideford, Westward Ho! and Appledore Railway (B,WH&A,R) was most unusual amongst British railways in that although it was built as a standard gauge line it was not joined to the rest of the railway network, despite the London and South Western Railway having a station at Bideford, East-the-Water, meaning on the other side of the River Torridge from the main town.

The line was wholly situated on the peninsula made up of Westward Ho!, Northam and Appledore with extensive sand dunes the Torridge and Taw estuary. Northam station and the line closed in 1917 having been requisitioned by the War Office, and is now used as part of the Tarka Trail cycle route which forms part of the South West Coast Path.

Bus services
Stagecoach 21= Ilfracombe to Westward Ho!
Stagecoach 21A= Ilfracombe to Appledore
Stagecoach 16 = Bideford - Westward Ho! - Appledore

W.Ho! buses serve the Square, Sandymere Rd and Atlantic Way.
 
Appledore buses serve Lenards Rd and Churchill Way.

16 bus service serves Morwenna Park Road, Sea View Road, Windsor Road and JH Taylor Drive

Notable residents
 Admiral Sir Richard Goodwin Keats G.C.B.resident of Port Hill and Durrant House
 Clarence Raybould, conductor, pianist and composer, buried with his wife in St Margaret's Church.
Rosemary West - serial killer

Footnotes

References
Stuckey, Douglas (1962). The Bideford, Westward Ho! and Appledore Railway 1901-1917. Pub. West Country Publications.

External links

 
 Northam Town Council
 Torridge District Council
  North Devon AONB website

Towns in Devon
Torridge District